The Sleeping Beauty problem is a puzzle in decision theory in which whenever an ideally rational epistemic agent is awoken from sleep, they have no memory of whether they have been awoken before. Upon being told that they have been woken once or twice according to the toss of a coin, once if heads and twice if tails, they are asked their degree of belief for the coin having come up heads.

History 
The problem was originally formulated in unpublished work in the mid-1980s by Arnold Zuboff (the work was later published as "One Self: The Logic of Experience") followed by a paper by Adam Elga. A formal analysis of the problem of belief formation in decision problems with imperfect recall was provided first by Michele Piccione and Ariel Rubinstein in their paper: "On the Interpretation of Decision Problems with Imperfect Recall" where the "paradox of the absent minded driver" was first introduced and the Sleeping Beauty problem discussed as Example 5.  The name "Sleeping Beauty" was given to the problem by Robert Stalnaker and was first used in extensive discussion in the Usenet newsgroup rec.puzzles in 1999.

The problem
Sleeping Beauty volunteers to undergo the following experiment and is told all of the following details: On Sunday she will be put to sleep. Once or twice, during the experiment, Sleeping Beauty will be awakened, interviewed, and put back to sleep with an amnesia-inducing drug that makes her forget that awakening. A fair coin will be tossed to determine which experimental procedure to undertake: 
 If the coin comes up heads, Sleeping Beauty will be awakened and interviewed on Monday only. 
 If the coin comes up tails, she will be awakened and interviewed on Monday and Tuesday. 
In either case, she will be awakened on Wednesday without interview and the experiment ends.

Any time Sleeping Beauty is awakened and interviewed she will not be able to tell which day it is or whether she has been awakened before. During the interview Sleeping Beauty is asked: "What is your credence now for the proposition that the coin landed heads?"

Solutions
This problem continues to produce ongoing debate.

Thirder position
The thirder position argues that the probability of heads is 1/3. Adam Elga argued for this position originally as follows: Suppose Sleeping Beauty is told and she comes to fully believe that the coin landed tails. By even a highly restricted principle of indifference, given that the coin lands tails, her credence that it is Monday should equal her credence that it is Tuesday, since being in one situation would be subjectively indistinguishable from the other. In other words, P(Monday  Tails) = P(Tuesday | Tails), and thus

P(Tails and Tuesday) = P(Tails and Monday).

Suppose now that Sleeping Beauty is told upon awakening and comes to fully believe that it is Monday. Guided by the objective chance of heads landing being equal to the chance of tails landing, it should hold that P(Tails | Monday) = P(Heads | Monday), and thus

P(Tails and Tuesday) = P(Tails and Monday) = P(Heads and Monday).

Since these three outcomes are exhaustive and exclusive for one trial (and thus their probabilities must add to 1), the probability of each is then 1/3 by the previous two steps in the argument.

An alternative argument is as follows: Credence can be viewed as the amount a rational risk-neutral bettor would wager if the payoff for being correct is 1 unit (the wager itself being lost either way). In the heads scenario, Sleeping Beauty would spend her wager amount one time, and receive 1 money for being correct. In the tails scenario, she would spend her wager amount twice, and receive nothing. Her expected value is therefore to gain 0.5 but also lose 1.5 times her wager, thus she should break even if her wager is 1/3.

Halfer position
David Lewis responded to Elga's paper with the position that Sleeping Beauty's credence that the coin landed heads should be 1/2. Sleeping Beauty receives no new non-self-locating information throughout the experiment because she is told the details of the experiment. Since her credence before the experiment is P(Heads) = 1/2, she ought to continue to have a credence of P(Heads) = 1/2 since she gains no new relevant evidence when she wakes up during the experiment. This directly contradicts one of the thirder's premises, since it means P(Tails | Monday) = 1/3 and P(Heads | Monday) = 2/3.

Double halfer position
The double halfer position argues that both P(Heads) and P(Heads | Monday) equal 1/2. Mikaël Cozic, in particular, argues that context-sensitive propositions like "it is Monday" are in general problematic for conditionalization and proposes the use of an imaging rule instead, which supports the double halfer position.

Connections to other problems

Credence about what precedes awakenings is a core question in connection with the anthropic principle.

Variations

Extreme Sleeping Beauty
This differs from the original in that there are one million and one wakings if tails comes up. It was formulated by Nick Bostrom.

Sailor's Child problem 
The Sailor's Child problem, introduced by Radford M. Neal, is somewhat similar. It involves a sailor who regularly sails between ports. In one port there is a woman who wants to have a child with him, across the sea there is another woman who also wants to have a child with him.  The sailor cannot decide if he will have one or two children, so he will leave it up to a coin toss. If Heads, he will have one child, and if Tails, two children. But if the coin lands on Heads, which woman would have his child? He would decide this by looking at The Sailor's Guide to Ports and the woman in the port that appears first would be the woman that he has a child with. You are his child. You do not have a copy of The Sailor's Guide to Ports. What is the probability that you are his only child, thus the coin landed on Heads (assume a fair coin)?

See also
Doomsday argument
Bayesian probability
Monty Hall problem
Boy or Girl paradox

References

Other works discussing the Sleeping Beauty problem
 
 
 
 
 Colombo, M., Lai, J. & Crupi, V. Sleeping Beauty Goes to the Lab: The Psychology of Self-Locating Evidence. Rev.Phil.Psych. 10, 173–185 (2019). https://doi.org/10.1007/s13164-018-0381-8
 
 
 
 
 
 Neal, R. (2006). Puzzles of Anthropic Reasoning Resolved Using Full Non-indexical Conditioning, preprint
 
 Titelbaum, M. (2013). Quitting Certainties, 210–229, 233–237, 241–249, 250, 276–277

External links
Terry Horgan: Sleeping Beauty Awakened: New Odds at the Dawn of the New Day (review paper with references)
 
 Anthropic Preprint Archive: The Sleeping Beauty Problem: An archive of papers on this problem
 Phil Papers Entry on Sleeping Beauty (a complete bibliography of papers on the problem)
 Twoplustwo thread discussing the sleeping beauty problem in depth

Probability theory paradoxes
Puzzles
Probability problems
Epistemology